PAF Base Masroor  is the largest airbase operated by the Pakistan Air Force. It is located in the Mauripur area of Karachi, in the Sindh province.
 
The base was originally known as RPAF Station Mauripur and after 1956, as PAF Station Mauripur.

PAF Base Faisal is the other Pakistan Air Force base in Karachi. The new PAF Base Bholari near Karachi was inaugurated in January 2018.

History

The airbase at Mauripur was established by Britain (Royal Indian Air Force, RIAF) during World War II in 1940–1941. On establishment of the Royal Pakistan Air Force (RPAF) the base became RPAF Station Mauripur.

PAF Base Mauripur was renamed PAF Base Masroor in honour of former Base Commander, Air Commodore Masroor Hussain, who died in June 1967 due to a bird strike on his aircraft. He managed to direct the burning aircraft away from a populated area before crashing.

Features
Masroor base has the distinction of not only being the largest base, area wise, in Pakistan but also in Asia. Before Karachi Airport, this airport had been used for domestic flights and also by Quaid-e-Azam Muhammad Ali Jinnah, the founder of Pakistan. It is of immense strategic importance considering it has been entrusted upon the task of defending the coastal and Southern region of Pakistan. It houses the 32 Tactical Attack (TA) Wing which comprises six separate squadrons. squadrons include
No 2 MR squadron operating JF-17C Block 2s, No 4 AWACS Squadron operating Karakoram Eagle AWACS, No 7 TA Squadron operating Mirage 3 ROSE 1, No 8 TA Squadron operating Mirage 5PA2/3, No 22 OCU operating Mirage 3EL/D and No 84 CSS operating AW-139 Seahawk CSAR helicopters.
Base is also home to College of Aviation safety management and Tactical Air Support school (TASS).

See also
 List of Pakistan Air Force Bases 
 List of airports in Pakistan
 Masroor Colony

References

External links
Pakistan Air Force (PAF) official website

Pakistan Air Force bases
Airports in Karachi
Military installations in Karachi